Teretia intermedia is an extinct species of sea snail, a marine gastropod mollusk in the family Raphitomidae.

Description

Distribution
Fossils of this marine species were found in Pliocene strata off Bologna, Italy

References

 Foresti, L. (1874) Catalogo dei molluschi fossili pliocenici delle colline bolognesi: Mem.Acc. Sc. Ist. Bologna, ser II, 7, 1–99.

External links
 Morassi M. & Bonfitto A. (2015). New Indo-Pacific species of the genus Teretia Norman, 1888 (Gastropoda: Raphitomidae). Zootaxa. 3911(4): 560-570 doi:10.11646/zootaxa.3911.4.5
 

intermedia
Gastropods described in 1874